This is the complete discography of the Canadian rock band Sum 41. The band has seven full-length studio albums, three live albums, 26 music videos, one compilation, four EPs, nine B-sides, and 24 singles.

Albums

Studio albums

Live albums

Compilation albums

Demo tapes
{|class="wikitable"
|-
! Year
! style="width:210px;"| Album details
|-
| 1998
| Rock Out With Your C*ck Out'''
Release: 1998
Label: Self-released
|}

Extended plays

Singles

Other songs

Other appearances
 "Rock You" - a cover of Helix from the movie soundtrack FUBAR: The Album.
 "Things I Want" - with Tenacious D for the KROQ compilation Swallow My Eggnog.
 "Unwritten Christmas" - with Unwritten Law for the KROQ compilation Swallow My Eggnog.
 "Little Know It All" - guest performance with Iggy Pop, later released as a single for the record Skull Ring.
 "Get Back" (Rock Remix) - a collaboration with Ludacris for the iTunes versions of Chuck and The Red Light District albums.
 "Killer Queen" - a cover of Queen recorded for the Killer Queen: A Tribute to Queen album.
 "Attitude" - a Misfits cover which was released only on the band's Myspace in 2006, during the recording sessions for Underclass Hero.
 "Loser" - a song by DJ Yodah and Mötley Crüe drummer Tommy Lee, featuring Lil Wayne, Sparkdawg, Big Sean, Joell Ortiz, J-Son, & Sum 41 under Geffen Records.
 "Look at Me" (extended version) - was leaked on the Internet.
 "Morning Glory" - an Oasis acoustic cover which Deryck has performed by himself.
 "How You Remind Me" - a cover of Nickelback which was perform on MTV's 2001 New Year's Anniversary.
 "Paint It, Black" - a cover of The Rolling Stones which was performed during almost all of the 2010 tour dates with lead guitarist Brown Tom singing lead vocals.
 "Rebel Yell" - a cover of Billy Idol which was performed during the early 2011 shows.
 "American Girl" - a cover of Tom Petty and the Heartbreakers which was performed during the early 2011 shows.
 "Master of Puppets" - a cover of Metallica which the band has performed during the MTV Icon of Metallica in 2003, and again through the 2009–2010 tour dates, randomly.
 "Enter Sandman" - a cover of Metallica which the band has performed during the MTV Icon of Metallica in 2003, and again through the 2009–2010 tour dates, randomly.
 "For Whom the Bell Tolls" - a cover of Metallica which the band has performed during the MTV Icon of Metallica in 2003, and again through the 2009–2010 tour dates, randomly.
 "Motorbreath" - a cover of Metallica which the band has performed during the MTV Icon of Metallica in 2003, and again through the 2009–2010 tour dates, randomly.
 "Battery" - a cover of Metallica which the band has performed during the MTV Icon of Metallica in 2003, and again through the 2009–2010 tour dates, randomly.
 "Blackened" - a cover of Metallica which the band has performed during the MTV Icon'' of Metallica in 2003, and again through the 2009–2010 tour dates, randomly.
 "Stone Cold Crazy" - a cover of Queen
 "We Will Rock You" - a cover of Queen

Videos

Video albums

Music videos

Notes

References

Discographies of Canadian artists
Pop punk group discographies
Discography